Bebaak (Dying wind in her hair) is a Hindi and Urdu language short film written and directed by Shazia Iqbal in 2019 and produced by Jar Pictures. This film is based on a true tale about a young woman named Fatin who was publicly reprimanded for being a woman at a scholarship interview by a religious leader.

Plot 
Based on a real-life incident, Bebaak examines the patriarchal idea of male agency over female bodies, which is based on a systematic theological notion that demands women cover up in order to be "more humble, respectful, and acceptable" by society. It tells the tale of Fatin, a young woman from a low-income family who encounters chauvinism and is reprimanded by a religious leader during a scholarship interview.

Cast 

 Sana Pathan
 Sheeba Chaddha
 Sarah Hashmi
 Vipin Sharma
 Nawazuddin Siddiqui

Awards

Reception 

 Bebaak views freedom as a network of connected crackers rather than a single spark that, when lighted, can burn the ground. It doesn't exhibit this hurry or lack of determination. The conclusion of a movie with significant themes revolves upon a little girl and her gaze, yearning, and anticipation.
 The film's script is incisive and to the point, highlighting the ridiculousness of the religious pressure placed on women to wear a certain manner, especially in an environment as modern as India.

Controversy 
The scandal surrounding Anurag Kashyap stems from his alleged negligence in a sexual assault accusation against his former business partner Vikas Bahl, and it has stained a short film he made on his own. The Kashyap and Jar Films-produced film Bebaak, starring Shazia Iqbal, has been removed from this month's Mumbai Film Festival.

References

External links 

 

Indian drama films
2019 films
2019 short films
Indian short films